Susan Sideropoulos (born 14 October 1980 in Hamburg) is a German actress.

Her father is of Greek descent while her mother is from Israel.

Since 14 March 2002, Sideropoulos has been portraying the role of Verena Koch in the German soap opera Gute Zeiten, schlechte Zeiten.

She was the winner of Season 2 of the German series Let's Dance.

On 4 July 2019, She was revealed to be the Butterfly on the German adaptation of The Masked Singer.

Filmography

External links
 

1980 births
German television actresses
German people of Israeli descent
German people of Greek descent
Living people
Dancing with the Stars winners
German soap opera actresses
Actresses from Hamburg
Jewish German actresses